Herman "Hemmo" Kallio (19 April 1863 – 8 September 1940) was a Finnish stage and film actor and playwright.

Career
Born Herman Puttonen, he officially changed his surname to Kallio in 1906. Herman began his professional career as a print shop director. He began his acting career in 1882 at the Helsinki Arkadia theater, then moved to the Finnish Theatre (now, the Finnish National Theatre), where he was engaged until he retired from the stage in the late 1930s. His long stint at the theater included a repertoire of over four hundred roles. From the 1920s Kallio began appearing in roles in Finnish films, often cast in fatherly roles.
The first of which was the 1920 Teuvo Puro-directed drama Ollin oppivuodet. One of his most popular film roles was that of Anna-Liisa's father in the 1922 Teuvo Puro and Jussi Snellman-directed silent film drama Anna-Liisa, based on the eponymously titled 1895 play by Finnish writer Minna Canth. Most of his silent film roles of the 1920s are now lost.

Hemmo Kallio died in Helsinki in 1940. He is the grandfather of Finnish actor Ismo Kallio.

Filmography

References

External links

Images of Hemmo Kallio at Kuvakokoelmat.fi 

1863 births
1940 deaths
Finnish male stage actors
Finnish male film actors
Finnish male silent film actors
People from Jyväskylä
19th-century Finnish male actors
20th-century Finnish male actors